Coffee, Tea or Me? is a 1973 American TV film based on the book of the same name. It was directed by Norman Panama.

Plot
An airline flight attendant juggles husbands in different cities.

Cast
Karen Valentine as Carol Burnham-Byrnes
John Davidson as Dennis Burnham
Michael Anderson Jr. as Tommy Byrnes
Louise Lasser as Susan Edmonds
Lou Jacobi as Waiter
Erica Hagen as Lisa Benton
George Coulouris as Doctor
Nora Marlowe as Mrs Fitzgerald
Kenneth Tobey as Captain
James Sikking as Businessman

Production
Film rights to the book were once owned by Robert Aldrich who bought them in 1968.

Aldrich wanted to make it under a deal he had with ABC Pictures. He had a script done by Theodore Flicker which he described as "very funny, very dirty" about a stewardess who tries to lose her virginity. "We took the Doris Day formula of all those successful Pillow Talk comedies and inverted it", said Aldrich. However ABC did not want to make it. "Nobody likes our script of it except me", said Aldrich.

When Aldrich's option lapsed it was picked up by CBS who made it as a TV movie which used the plot of The Captain's Paradise (1953). "It's not all that naughty", said star Karen Valentine. "It's done in the best possible taste."

Reception
The Los Angeles Times praised the acting but criticised the "creaky material".

However the ratings "went through the roof" when the show aired.

References

External links

1973 television films
1973 films
Films based on books
Films about flight attendants
Films directed by Norman Panama